The South Division Two (currently known as the 'Mowi South Division 2' for sponsorship reasons) is the fourth tier of the Shinty league system. League Champions are promoted to the South Division One.

Current Teams 
The 2022 Mowi South Division 2 will consist of the following teams:

*Denotes Reserve team

Aberdour Shinty Club 2nd*
Tayforth Camanachd
Inverary Shinty Club 2nd*
Kilmory Camanachd
Oban Celtic 2nd*
Strachur-Dunoon Shinty Club

List of winners (since 2014)
2014 - Inveraray Shinty Club 2nd
2015 - Col-Glen Shinty Club
2016 - Tayforth Camanachd
2017 - Inveraray Shinty Club 2nd
2018 - Strachur and District Shinty Club
2019 - Kilmory Camanachd
2020 - No season due to Covid-19 pandemic.
2021 - N/A
2022 - Bute Shinty Club

References
2.

External links
Marine Harvest North Division One

Shinty competitions